Gökçeören is a village in the Orta District, Çankırı Province, Turkey. Its population is 117 (2021).

References

Villages in Orta District